Statistics of Scottish Football League in season 1971/1972.

Scottish League Division One

Scottish League Division Two

See also
1971–72 in Scottish football

References

 
Scottish Football League seasons